The men's field hockey tournament at the 2015 Pan American Games was held in Toronto, Canada at the Pan Am / Parapan Am Fields from July 14 to 25.

For these Games, the men competed in an 8-team tournament. The teams were grouped into two pools of four teams each for a round-robin preliminary round. All teams will advance to an eight team single elimination bracket.

Argentina were the defending champions from the 2011 Pan American Games in Guadalajara, defeating Canada, 3–1 in the final.

The winner of this tournament, if not already qualified, qualified for the 2016 Summer Olympics in Rio de Janeiro.

Qualification
A total of eight men's teams qualified to compete at the games. The top two teams at the South American and Central American and Caribbean Games qualified for the tournament. The host nation (Canada) automatically qualified as well. The remaining three spots were given to the three best teams from the 2013 Pan American Cup that had not qualified yet. This happened after the two qualification tournaments in 2014 were played. Each nation may enter one team (16 athletes per team).

Summary

Pools
Pools were based on the world rankings as of January 21, 2015. Teams were placed into pools using the serpentine system. Teams ranked 1, 4, 5 and 8 would be in Pool A, while teams ranked 2, 3, 6 and 7 would be in Pool B.

Rankings are listed in parenthesis.

Rosters

At the start of the tournament, all eight participating countries had up to 16 players on their rosters.

Competition format
In the first round of the competition, teams were divided into two pools of four teams, and play followed round robin format with each of the teams playing all other teams in the pool once. Teams were awarded three points for a win, one point for a draw and zero points for a loss.

Following the completion of the pool games, all eight teams advanced to a single elimination round consisting of four quarterfinal games, two semifinal games, and the bronze and gold medal matches. Losing teams competed in classification matches to determine their ranking in the tournament. A penalty stroke competition took place, if a classification match ended in a draw, to determine a winner.

All games were played in four 15 minute quarters.

Medalists

Results
The official schedule was revealed on February 18, 2015.

All times are Eastern Daylight Time (UTC−4)

Preliminary round

Pool A

Pool B

Classification round

Quarter-finals

Fifth to eighth place classification

Cross-overs

Seventh and eighth place

Fifth and sixth place

Semi-finals

Bronze medal match

Gold medal match

Final standings

Goalscorers

See also
Field hockey at the 2016 Summer Olympics – Men's tournament

References

External links
World Rankings as of January 21, 2015

 
Men
Pan American Games
2015